An executive order is a directive issued by the President of the United States.

Executive order may also refer to:
Executive order (Philippines), a directive issued by the President of the Philippines
List of United States federal executive orders
State executive order, a directive issued by the governor of U.S. state

See also
Executive Orders, 1996 novel by Tom Clancy
Executive Order (film), a 2020 film
Executive (disambiguation)
Order (disambiguation)
Presidential proclamation (United States)
Statutory instrument